Ipf or IPF may refer to:

Computing
 Interchangeable Preservation Format, an Amiga Disk File format
 Invalid page fault, related to virtual memory
 Information Presentation Facility, help system on OS/2
 IPFilter, firewall and NAT on Unix
 Itanium processor family, a computer architecture

Other
 Idiopathic pulmonary fibrosis, a chronic and fatal disease affecting lung function
 Independent Production Fund,  a foundation that supports the production of Canadian entertainment content
 Indian People's Front, a mass organisation
 Intaken piled fathom, a cubic measure used for the shipment of pit props
 International Pen Friends, an organization providing pen pals
 International Policy Forum, student-run think tank based at Carleton University in Ottawa, Ontario, Canada
 International Powerlifting Federation
 Ipf (mountain), a mountain in southern Germany
 Iterative proportional fitting, estimates values in an N-dimensional matrix

See also
 YPF, an Argentinian oil company. Its name is spelled out in Spanish as "IPF".